Frederic Christian Thompson (April 24, 1944 – February 4, 2021) was an American entomologist specializing in the study of Diptera.

Works
Thompson, F. Christian (1991). "The Flower Fly genus Ornidia (Diptera:Syrphidae)" (PDF). Proceedings of the Entomological Society of Washington. 93 (2): 248–261.
Thompson, F. Christian. (1999). "A key to the genera of the flower flies (Diptera: Syrphidae) of the Neotropical Region including descriptions of new genera and species and a glossary of taxonomic terms used" (PDF). Contributions on Entomology, International. 3 (3): 321–378

See also
:Category:Taxa named by F. Christian Thompson

References

1944 births
2021 deaths
American entomologists
Dipterists